General Coffee State Park is a  Georgia state park located near Douglas. The park is named after politician, farmer, and military leader General John E. Coffee. The park is host to many rare and endangered species, especially in the cypress swamps through which the Seventeen Mile River winds.

Attractions include a corn crib, tobacco barn, and cane mill. Visitors can stay overnight at the Burnham House, a renovated and elegantly redecorated 19th-century cabin.

Facilities
50 Tent/Trailer/RV Campsites
1 Pioneer Campground
5 Cottages
Burnham Cottage & Hawksnest House
1 Group Lodge
1 Group Shelter
7 Picnic Shelters
Heritage Farm
Outdoor Amphitheater

Annual events
Canoe Trip on the Satilla River (March)
Lovebug Festival (September)
Pioneer Skills Day (November)
Christmas on the Pond (December)

Gallery

See also
Coffee Road

References

External links
Georgia State Parks

State parks of Georgia (U.S. state)
Protected areas of Coffee County, Georgia